Matija Mišić (born 30 January 1992 in Županja) is a Croatian football player, who currently plays for Croatian second tier-outfit BSK Bijelo Brdo.

Personal life
He is the older brother of Josip Mišić.

Career

Kisvárda
On 30 July 2017, Mišić played his first match for Kisvárda in a 3-3 drawn against Mosonmagyaróvár in the Hungarian League Second level.

Club statistics

Updated to games played as of 19 May 2019.

References

External links

1992 births
Living people
People from Županja
Association football midfielders
Croatian footballers
NK Osijek players
NK Inter Zaprešić players
NK Solin players
HNK Cibalia players
Kisvárda FC players
Soroksár SC players
NK BSK Bijelo Brdo players
Croatian Football League players
First Football League (Croatia) players
Nemzeti Bajnokság I players
Nemzeti Bajnokság II players
Croatian expatriate footballers
Expatriate footballers in Hungary
Croatian expatriate sportspeople in Hungary